Claire Margaret Corlett (born July 9, 1999) is a Canadian actress, known most notably for her nine years of voice work on the family fantasy/comedy animated television series My Little Pony: Friendship is Magic, for which she provided the voice for the supporting character Sweetie Belle.

Career
She is best known for being the voice of Sweetie Belle in the TV series My Little Pony: Friendship Is Magic, Michelle in 3-2-1 Penguins and Tiny in Dinosaur Train. She was first introduced to voice acting when her father Ian James Corlett made her a demo when she was five years old. She is also the younger sister of voice actor Philip Corlett who did the voice of Buddy on Dinosaur Train.

Her very first voice acting role was as a preschooler in an episode of Being Ian, an animated series created by her father which was based on his life.

She collaborated on Smart Cookies with actress Michelle Creber, who also worked on My Little Pony: Friendship Is Magic as the voice of Apple Bloom (and singing voice of Sweetie Belle, seasons 1–3).

Personal life
Corlett was born in Vancouver, British Columbia. She attended the University of British Columbia for Creative Writing. She dropped out in 2019.

In 2019, she lived in Los Angeles.

Corlett started dating Gabriel Christian Brown in 2020, a fellow voice actor who she met through her voice work on My Little Pony: Friendship is Magic, and as of 2021, lives with him in Arizona. Corlett became engaged on January 29, 2022 to Brown. They got married on November 12, 2022.

Filmography

Animation

Live action

References

External links
 
 

1999 births
Living people
Actresses from Vancouver
Canadian expatriate actresses in the United States
Canadian film actresses
Canadian television actresses
Canadian voice actresses
21st-century Canadian actresses